Clarke Glacier may refer to:
 Clarke Glacier (Graham Land), Antarctica
 Clarke Glacier (Victoria Land), Antarctica
 Clarke Glacier (Marie Byrd Land), Antarctica
 Clarke Glacier (New Zealand)

See also 
 Clark Glacier (disambiguation)